Campo's Deli, also known as Campo's Philly Cheesesteaks, is a deli that was founded in 1947 on Market St in Old City, Philadelphia. The restaurant has been highly ranked for its cheesesteaks and other deli sandwiches.

History

Ambrose and Rose Campo opened Campo's in 1947. The next generation of the family took over the restaurant in 1975; the current owner is Michael Campo, grandson of Ambrose and Rose. Campo's Deli remains a family owned business. 

Besides cheesesteaks, Campo's is also known for its Italian hoagie which is made with Dilusso salami, ham capicola, peppered ham, pepperoni, prosciutto and provolone.  

Campo's is also well-known for offering vegan options of their famous sandwiches and cheesesteaks. Another popular item Campo's offers is "The Heater", a cheesesteaks with hot peppers.

See also
 List of submarine sandwich restaurants

References

External links
 

Submarine sandwich restaurants
Restaurants in Philadelphia
1947 establishments in Pennsylvania
Restaurants established in 1947